Christopher Ashon Claiborne (born July 26, 1978) is an American football coach and former player who was a linebacker in the National Football League (NFL) for eight seasons. Claiborne played college football for the University of Southern California, and was recognized as an All-American. He was a first-round pick in the 1999 NFL Draft, and played professionally for the Detroit Lions, Minnesota Vikings, St. Louis Rams, and New York Giants of the NFL.

After ending his playing career, he entered coaching at the high school level. In 2020, he returned to USC's football team as a quality control analyst and most recently was the Linebackers coach at Arizona State. He currently is the Linebackers coach for the St. Louis BattleHawks of the XFL.

Early years
Claiborne was born in San Diego, California.  He attended John W. North High School in Riverside, California, and was a letterman in both football and basketball.  In football, he won All-State honors at both running back and linebacker as a senior under head coach Mark Paredes.  Claiborne graduated from high school in 1996.

College career
Claiborne accepted an athletic scholarship to attend the University of Southern California, where he played for the USC Trojans football team from 1996 to 1998.  As a senior in 1998, he was recognized as a consensus first-team All-American. He is also USC's first and only Butkus award winner.

Professional career
He signed with the Jacksonville Jaguars in August 2007 but was released before the start of the  regular season.

Coaching
In February 2013, Claiborne began coaching at Oaks Christian School in Westlake Village, California. He moved to Calabasas High School in 2014 as defensive coordinator, and took over as head coach in 2018. He resigned in December 2019; in two years as Calabasas' head coach, he went 17–6.

Claiborne returned to USC in 2020 as a quality control analyst; he had received his bachelor' degree from the university in 2019.  On January 25, 2021 Claiborne was named linebackers coach at Arizona State.

References

External links
 TSN Bio

1978 births
Living people
All-American college football players
American football linebackers
Arizona State Sun Devils football coaches
Detroit Lions players
Jacksonville Jaguars players
Minnesota Vikings players
New York Giants players
Players of American football from Riverside, California
Players of American football from San Diego
St. Louis Rams players
USC Trojans football players